Kilcumny is a civil parish in County Westmeath, Ireland.

Kilcumny is one of 7 civil parishes in the barony of Delvin in the Province of Leinster.

Kilcumny civil parish comprises 13 townlands: Ballymacahil and Derries, Ballynagall, Bananstown, Kilcumny, Cooleighter, Drumcree, Glananea or Ralphsdale, Gormanstown, Grangestown, Johnstown, Kilwalter, Loughstown and Robinstown.

The neighbouring civil parishes are: St. Marys (barony of Fore) to the north, Clonarney and Delvin to the east, Killulagh to the south and St. Feighin's (Fore) to the west.

References

External links
Map of Kilcumny civil parish at openstreetmap.org
Kilcumny civil parish at the IreAtlas Townland Data Base
Kilcumny civil parish at Townlands.ie
Kilcumny civil parish at The Placename Database of Ireland

Civil parishes of County Westmeath